Chrysopsyche pauliani is a moth of the family Lasiocampidae first described by Pierre Viette in 1962. It is found in Madagascar.

References
Viette, P. 1962. Bulletin mensuel de la Société linnéenne de Lyon. 31:221.

External links

Lasiocampinae
Moths of Madagascar
Moths of Africa